

Films

References

LGBT
1999 in LGBT history
1999